Shaban Ibrahim (born 1 September 1957) is an Egyptian wrestler. He competed in the men's Greco-Roman 68 kg at the 1984 Summer Olympics.

References

1957 births
Living people
Egyptian male sport wrestlers
Olympic wrestlers of Egypt
Wrestlers at the 1984 Summer Olympics
Place of birth missing (living people)